McKitterick is a surname. Notable people with the surname include:

Christopher McKitterick (born 1967), American writer
David McKitterick (born 1948), English librarian
Rosamond McKitterick, British historian

See also
McKitterick Prize, British literary prize
McKittrick